Marcin Kaczmarek (born 2 January 1974) is a Polish football manager and former player, currently in charge of Ekstraklasa club Lechia Gdańsk. He was previously a pundit and commentator for Polsat Sport. During his career, Kaczmarek played in Ekstraklasa for Pogoń Szczecin and GKS Bełchatów, making a total of 97 appearances in Poland's top division.

Senior career 

Kaczmarek had been part of the Lechia Gdańsk academy, before being promoted to the first team at the beginning of the 1990 season. His Lechia debut came in a 1–0 win over Szombierki Bytom on 3 June 1990, in which he played 44 minutes. During his first two seasons with Lechia, Kaczmerek struggled to break into the first team, relying on few substitute appearances to get game time. Kaczmarek's first professional league start came in his third season when he started in a home game against Miedź Legnica. As he developed as a player, he also saw more game time with the club, making over 20 league appearances in each of his last two seasons. Despite becoming a more important player, Kaczmarek played with Lechia during a difficult period in their history in which they found themselves mostly uncompetitive and finishing towards the lower ends of the II liga. Despite Lechia's struggles, Kaczmarek made a total 77 appearances and scored 22 goals in all competitions during his first spell with the club, with his most successful season with Lechia being during the 1993–94 campaign, where he played 32 games and scored 9 goals. 

His good form for Lechia earned Kaczmarek a move to Poland's top division when he joined I liga team Pogoń Szczecin in 1994 aged 21. He instantly found himself to be an important player with Pogoń, going on to make 26 appearances in his first I liga season, also scoring a goal against Widzew Łódź in a 1–0 win, the goal would turn out to be Kaczmareks only goal in Polands highest division. He made another 26 appearances the following season, however it was a season where the team as a whole struggled, winning only 2 of their 30 league games, and scoring only 9 points all season. After facing relegation with Pogoń to the II liga, they bounced back to the top flight at the first time of asking in 1997, finishing runners-up behind Dyskobolia Grodzisk. He made a further 33 appearances in the I liga with Pogoń over the next 18 months, before being transferred to fellow Ekstraklasa team GKS Bełchatów in January 1999. Kaczmarek made 11 appearances with Bełchatów that season, with the team struggling in the league, and Kaczmarek being relegated from the I liga for a second time. He continued to play with Bełchatów in the second division for a further two years before injuries started to affect his playing time and abilities and he was released midway through his fourth season with the club. In 2002 Kaczmarek dropped down into the lower leagues with Unia Tczew, spending 6 months with Unia, and making only 5 appearances with the club, due to his time in Tczew being plagued by injury, before joining Stomil Olsztyn for the next six months. After his time at Stomil, Kaczmarek returned to Lechia Gdańsk for a season working as both the assistant manager while also being a player. He went on to make 22 appearances and scoring 3 goals for the club as they won promotion from the fourth tier. In 2004, at the age of 30, and seeing a decline in performance and a drop down the leagues due to consistent injuries for the last 3 years of his playing career, Kaczmarek decided to retire from playing football and to focus on coaching in football.

Managerial career

After the game on 22 May 2004, Jerzy Jastrzębowski left as the manager of Lechia. Kaczmarek retired from playing and instantly found first managerial position with Lechia Gdańsk, leading the club in the final six games of the season. Under his guidance, Lechia achieved promotion from the fourth tier to the second tier of Polish football. 

After achieving safety for Lechia in I liga, Kaczmarek returned to another club he had previously played for, joining Pogoń Szczecin in 2006. After managing the team for the first half of the season, Kaczmarek was told he would not be manager for the second half. 

After his short spell with Pogoń, Kaczmarek took charge of Olimpia Grudziądz in 2008. His 4 seasons with Olimpia were successful, and while under his command he saw Olimpia winning the III liga in 2009, and the II liga in 2011. 

In 2012, he joined Wisła Płock, who had just been relegated from I liga. In his first season Wisła won the third tier, ensuring promotion back to I liga. After a further three more seasons with Wisła, Kaczmarek saw his side finish runners-up in I Liga, and promoted to Ekstraklasa. His first season in top division saw Wisła finish comfortably in 10th. 

In 2018, Kaczmarek joined recently relegated Bruk-Bet Termalica Nieciecza in I liga, leading the club until the end of the season. 

Ahead of the 2019–20 season, Kaczmarek was appointed manager of Widzew Łódź, leaving after his contract finished the following summer.

On 19 September 2022, Kaczmarek returned to Ekstraklasa and Lechia, agreeing to a two-year deal to manage his former club who at the time were placed bottom of the league table.

Personal life
He is the son of former footballer and manager Bogusław Kaczmarek. His wife, Magdalena Skorupka-Kaczmarek, is a journalist.

Honours

Player

Pogoń Szczecin
II liga, grupa zachodnia: 1996–97 (runners-up)

Lechia Gdańsk
III liga, grupa pomorska: 2003–04

Manager

Lechia Gdańsk
II liga, grupa II: 2004–05
III liga, grupa pomorska: 2003–04

Olimpia Grudziądz
III liga, grupa II: 2008–09
II liga, grupa zachodnia: 2010–11

Wisła Płock
II liga, grupa wschodnia: 2012–13
I liga: 2015–16 (runners-up)

References

1974 births
Living people
People from Sztum
Sportspeople from Pomeranian Voivodeship
Association football defenders
Association football midfielders
Polish footballers
Lechia Gdańsk players
Pogoń Szczecin players
GKS Bełchatów players
Unia Tczew players
OKS Stomil Olsztyn players
Ekstraklasa players
I liga players
II liga players
Polish football managers
Lechia Gdańsk managers
Pogoń Szczecin managers
Olimpia Grudziądz managers
Wisła Płock managers
Bruk-Bet Termalica Nieciecza managers
Widzew Łódź managers
Ekstraklasa managers
I liga managers
II liga managers